Chorthippus binotatus, the two-marked grasshopper, is a species of slant-faced grasshopper in the family Acrididae. It is found in Europe.

Subspecies
These subspecies belong to the species Chorthippus binotatus:
 Chorthippus binotatus armoricanus (Defaut, 2015)
 Chorthippus binotatus atlasi Defaut, 1987
 Chorthippus binotatus binotatus (Charpentier, 1825)

References

Further reading

External links

 

binotatus